In mathematics, the polar decomposition of a square real or complex matrix  is a factorization of the form , where  is an orthogonal matrix and  is a positive semi-definite symmetric matrix ( is a unitary matrix and  is a positive semi-definite Hermitian matrix in the complex case), both square and of the same size. 

The polar decomposition of a square matrix  always exists. If  is invertible, the decomposition is unique, and the factor  will be positive-definite. This decomposition is useful in computing the fundamental group of (matrix) Lie groups.

The polar decomposition can also be defined as  where  is a symmetric positive-definite matrix with the same eigenvalues as  but different eigenvectors.

The matrix  is unique if and only if  has full rank.

Intuitive interpretation
Then, in the polar decomposition , the factor  is an  real orthonormal matrix.

The scale factors are the same, but the directions are different.

Properties
In particular, if  has determinant 1 then both  and  have determinant 1.

The uniqueness of P ensures that this expression is well-defined. The uniqueness is guaranteed by the fact that  is a positive-semidefinite Hermitian matrix and, therefore, has a unique positive-semidefinite Hermitian square root. If A is invertible, then P is positive-definite, thus also invertible and the matrix U is uniquely determined by

Relation to the SVD

Thus, the existence of the SVD is equivalent to the existence of polar decomposition.

Left polar decomposition is also known as reverse polar decomposition.

The polar decomposition of a square invertible real matrix  is of the form

Relation to Normal matrices

The matrix  with polar decomposition  is normal if and only  and  commute: , or equivalently, they are simultaneously diagonalizable.

Construction and proofs of existence 
The core idea behind the construction of the polar decomposition is similar to that used to compute the singular-value decomposition.

Derivation for normal matrices 
If  is normal, then it is unitarily equivalent to a diagonal matrix:  for some unitary matrix  and some diagonal matrix . This makes the derivation of its polar decomposition particularly straightforward, as we can then write

Derivation for invertible matrices 
From the singular-value decomposition, it can be shown that a matrix  is invertible if and only if  (equivalently) is.

In this case, the polar decomposition is directly obtained by writing

and observing that  is unitary.

In this expression,  is unitary because  is. To show that also  is unitary, we can use the SVD to write , so that 

where again  is unitary by construction.

 
which directly implies the unitarity of  because a matrix is unitary if and only if its singular values have unitary absolute value.

Note how, from the above construction, it follows that the unitary matrix in the polar decomposition of an invertible matrix is uniquely defined.

General derivation 
The SVD of a squared matrix  reads , with  unitary matrices, and  a diagonal, positive semi-definite matrix. We can now apply the same reasoning used in the above equation to write , but now  is not in general unitary.

As an explicit example of this more general case, consider the SVD of the following matrix:We then havewhich is an isometry, but not unitary. On the other hand, if we consider the decomposition ofwe findwhich is a partial isometry (but not an isometry).

Bounded operators on Hilbert space
The polar decomposition of any bounded linear operator A between complex Hilbert spaces is a canonical factorization as the product of a partial isometry and a non-negative operator.

The polar decomposition for matrices generalizes as follows: if A is a bounded linear operator then there is a unique factorization of A as a product A = UP where U is a partial isometry, P is a non-negative self-adjoint operator and the initial space of U is the closure of the range of P.

The operator U must be weakened to a partial isometry, rather than unitary, because of the following issues. If A is the one-sided shift on l2(N), then |A| = {AA}1/2 = I. So if A = U |A|, U must be A, which is not unitary.

The existence of a polar decomposition is a consequence of Douglas' lemma:

The operator C can be defined by C(Bh) := Ah for all h in H, extended by continuity to the closure of Ran(B), and by zero on the orthogonal complement to all of H. The lemma then follows since AA ≤ BB implies Ker(B) ⊂ Ker(A).

In particular. If AA = BB, then C is a partial isometry, which is unique if Ker(B) ⊂ Ker(C).
In general, for any bounded operator A,

where (AA)1/2 is the unique positive square root of AA given by the usual functional calculus. So by the lemma, we have

for some partial isometry U, which is unique if Ker(A) ⊂ Ker(U). Take P to be (AA)1/2 and one obtains the polar decomposition A = UP. Notice that an analogous argument can be used to show A = P'U, where P'  is positive and U a partial isometry.

When H is finite-dimensional, U can be extended to a unitary operator; this is not true in general (see example above). Alternatively, the polar decomposition can be shown using the operator version of singular value decomposition.

By property of the continuous functional calculus, |A| is in the C*-algebra generated by A. A similar but weaker statement holds for the partial isometry: U is in the von Neumann algebra generated by A. If A is invertible, the polar part U will be in the C*-algebra as well.

Unbounded operators
If A is a closed, densely defined unbounded operator between complex Hilbert spaces then it still has a (unique) polar decomposition

where |A| is a (possibly unbounded) non-negative self adjoint operator with the same domain as A, and U is a partial isometry vanishing on the orthogonal complement of the range Ran(|A|).

The proof uses the same lemma as above, which goes through for unbounded operators in general. If Dom(AA) = Dom(BB) and AAh = BBh for all h ∈ Dom(AA), then there exists a partial isometry U such that A = UB. U is unique if Ran(B)⊥ ⊂ Ker(U). The operator A being closed and densely defined ensures that the operator AA is self-adjoint (with dense domain) and therefore allows one to define (AA)1/2. Applying the lemma gives polar decomposition.

Quaternion polar decomposition
The polar decomposition of quaternions H depends on the unit 2-dimensional sphere  of square roots of minus one. Given any r on this sphere, and an angle −π < a ≤ π, the versor  is on the unit 3-sphere of H. For a = 0 and a = π, the versor is 1 or −1 regardless of which r is selected. The norm t of a quaternion q is the Euclidean distance from the origin to q. When a quaternion is not just a real number, then there is a unique polar decomposition

Alternative planar decompositions
In the Cartesian plane, alternative planar ring decompositions arise as follows:
{{bulleted list
| If ,  is a polar decomposition of a dual number , where ; i.e., ε is nilpotent. In this polar decomposition, the unit circle has been replaced by the line , the polar angle by the slope y/x, and the radius x is negative in the left half-plane.
| If , then the unit hyperbola  and its conjugate  can be used to form a polar decomposition based on the branch of the unit hyperbola through . This branch is parametrized by the hyperbolic angle a and is written

where  and the arithmetic<ref>Sobczyk, G.(1995) "Hyperbolic Number Plane", College Mathematics Journal 26:268–80</ref> of split-complex numbers is used. The branch through  is traced by −eaj. Since the operation of multiplying by j reflects a point across the line , the second hyperbola has branches traced by jeaj or −jeaj. Therefore a point in one of the quadrants has a polar decomposition in one of the forms:

The set  has products that make it isomorphic to the Klein four-group. Evidently polar decomposition in this case involves an element from that group.
}}

Numerical determination of the matrix polar decomposition
To compute an approximation of the polar decomposition A = UP, usually the unitary factor U is approximated.

The combination of inversion and Hermite conjugation is chosen so that in the singular value decomposition, the unitary factors remain the same and the iteration reduces to Heron's method on the singular values.

This basic iteration may be refined to speed up the process:

See also
Cartan decomposition
Algebraic polar decomposition
Polar decomposition of a complex measure
Lie group decomposition

References 

 Conway, J.B.: A Course in Functional Analysis. Graduate Texts in Mathematics. New York: Springer 1990
 Douglas, R.G.: On Majorization, Factorization, and Range Inclusion of Operators on Hilbert Space. Proc. Amer. Math. Soc. 17, 413-415 (1966)
 .
 

Lie groups
Operator theory
Matrix theory
Matrix decompositions